Paul Carrington (born November 11, 1982) is a former American football defensive end. He was signed by the Atlanta Falcons as an undrafted free agent in 2006. He played college football at UCF.

Carrington was also a member of the Denver Broncos and California Redwoods.

Professional career

Atlanta Falcons
After going undrafted in the 2006 NFL Draft, Carrington signed with the Atlanta Falcons as an undrafted free agent. He appeared in 15 games (starting two) for the Falcons as a rookie, recording 37 tackles, three sacks and a forced fumble.

The Falcons waived Carrington during final cuts on September 1, 2007.

Denver Broncos
Carringon signed with the Denver Broncos on November 6, 2007, but was inactive for every game with the team that season. He was waived by the Broncos on August 30 and spent the rest of the season out of football.

California Redwoods
Carrington was signed by the California Redwoods of the United Football League on August 18, 2009.

References

External links
Just Sports Stats
Denver Broncos bio
UCF Knights bio
United Football League bio

1982 births
Living people
Players of American football from Savannah, Georgia
American football defensive ends
UCF Knights football players
Atlanta Falcons players
Denver Broncos players
Sacramento Mountain Lions players